Amblychia infoveata is a moth in the family Geometridae. It is found in Borneo, Peninsular Malaysia and Sumatra.

External links
The Moths of Borneo

Boarmiini
Moths of Asia
Moths described in 1932